Laguna di Orbetello is a lake in the Province of Grosseto, Tuscany, Italy. At an elevation of 1 m, its surface area is 26.9 km2.

Overview 
It is separated from the Tyrrhenian Sea by two tombolos (Giannella in the north and Feniglia in the south) that join the promontory of Monte Argentario to continental territory. In the middle of the lagoon, on another land strip, is located the town of Orbetello.

See also
Orbetello Airfield
Porto Ercole
Porto Santo Stefano

References 

Orbetello
Province of Grosseto
Ramsar sites in Italy